Marie A. Bernard, M.D. is the Chief Officer for Scientific Workforce Diversity at the National Institutes of Health (NIH). Prior to this, she was the Deputy Director of the National Institute on Aging at the NIH, where she oversaw approximately $3.1 billion in research focused on aging and Alzheimer's disease. Bernard co-leads the NIH UNITE initiative, launched in 2021 to end structural racism in biomedicine. She co-chairs the Inclusion Governance Committee, which promotes inclusion in clinical research by sex/gender, race/ethnicity, and age. She also co-chairs two of the Department of Health and Human Services Healthy People 2020 objectives: 1) Older Adults, and 2) Dementias, including Alzheimer's Disease. Prior to arriving at NIH in 2008, Bernard served as Donald W. Reynolds Chair in Geriatric Medicine and founding chairperson of the Donald W. Reynolds Department of Geriatric Medicine at the University of Oklahoma College of Medicine, and Associate Chief of Staff for Geriatrics and Extended Care at the Oklahoma City Veterans Affairs Medical Center.

Bernard’s research interests include nutrition and function in aging populations, with particular emphasis upon ethnic minorities.

Bernard has received two national awards for her leadership in geriatric medicine: the 2014 Kent Award of the Gerontological Society of America; and the 2013 Clark Tibbits Award of Association of Gerontology in Higher Education.

Education and career

Bernard received her undergraduate training at Bryn Mawr College in 1972, where she graduated cum laude with Honors in Chemistry and received her M.D. degree from University of Pennsylvania School of Medicine in 1976. She trained in internal medicine at Temple University Hospital in Philadelphia, Pennsylvania, where she also served as chief resident. Following her residency, Bernard continued her career at Temple's School of Medicine, starting as an Instructor in Medicine, then serving as Associate Professor of Medicine in the Division of General Internal Medicine, Director of Medical Clinics, and Assistant Dean for Admissions.

In 1990, Bernard joined the University of Oklahoma to build its geriatrics education and research programs. Until her move to the NIA, Bernard was the founding director of Oklahoma's Reynolds Department of Geriatric Medicine, the third Department of Geriatrics in the U.S. In addition to founding and directing the department, Dr. Bernard also served as Associate Chief of Staff for Geriatrics and Extended Care at the Oklahoma City Veterans Affairs Medical Center.

Bernard has received additional training through the Association of American Medical Colleges Health Services Research Institute, the Geriatric Education Center of Pennsylvania, and the Wharton School Executive Development program.

Bernard led the development of the National Institute on Aging Health Disparities Research Framework, published in 2015, which focused on assessing progress and opportunities in research on health disparities among racial and ethnic groups related to aging. 
On May 26, 2021, she was named Chief Officer for Scientific Workforce Diversity for the National Institutes of Health.

Medical and research achievements
2020	Barbara Payne Lectureship in Gerontology, Georgia State University
2014	Kent Award, Gerontological Society of America (given annually to a member of the Society “who best exemplifies the highest standards for professional leadership in gerontology”)
2013	Clark Tibbits Award, Association of Gerontology in Higher Education (for outstanding contributions to gerontology and geriatrics education)
2008	50 over 50 Award, AARP, Oklahoma Chapter
2007	Pathmakers award, Oklahoma City/County Historical Society
2007-2010	Hartford Senior Leadership Scholar

References

Living people
Year of birth missing (living people)
American gerontologists
National Institutes of Health people
Bryn Mawr College alumni
Perelman School of Medicine at the University of Pennsylvania alumni
University of Oklahoma faculty
NIH Women Scientists Project
Women medical researchers
African-American scientists
20th-century American scientists
21st-century American scientists
20th-century American women scientists
21st-century American women scientists
20th-century American physicians
21st-century American physicians
20th-century American women physicians
21st-century American women physicians
American women academics
20th-century African-American women
20th-century African-American people
20th-century African-American physicians
21st-century African-American women
21st-century African-American physicians